The Northeast Conference soccer tournament is the conference soccer championship of the NCAA Division I Northeast Conference. The top four finishers in the regular season of the conference's eight teams advance to the single-elimination tournament. The tournament is held at the campus of the regular season champion. The winner of the tournament receives an automatic berth to the NCAA Division I Men's Soccer Championship. The NEC started fielding men's soccer games in 1985 and started a conference tournament in 1989, Fairleigh Dickinson won the inaugural championship.

St. Francis Brooklyn have won the most titles with nine (9). Fairleigh Dickinson holds the longest consecutive championship streak (4, 2000–03), followed by Monmouth (3, 2009–11). Participation of NEC Tournament Champions in the NCAA tournament has led to an overall record of 11–20, with Fairleigh Dickinson accounting for 7 wins followed by Central Connecticut and Monmouth with 2 wins apiece.

Champions

By year
The following is a list of conference regular season champions, tournament champions and tournament MVPs listed by year.

‡-Tournament Championships began in 1989^ Played without fans in attendance due to the COVID-19 pandemic

Champions by program
The following is a list of conference tournament champions listed by school.

References

External links
 

 
Tournament
NCAA Division I men's soccer conference tournaments